Becoming Who We Are is the first studio album from Kings Kaleidoscope with label partner Tooth & Nail Records. It is their third offering after 2014's Live in Color (EP) on Bad Christian Records and 2013's independently made Joy Has Dawned (EP). The album came out on October 28, 2014.

Upon its release, it was acclaimed by various music reviewers, who highlighted its eclectic and experimental musical nature. It has been noted as an unconventional work in the world of modern worship music, and is credited with pushing the genre's boundaries with an unclassifiable style.

Composition
Reviewers acknowledged the album's musical eclecticism, from "autotune usage" to "a ska-like horns section" to "strong hip hop influences" to "an orchestral string section".

The record is kicked off by "Glorious", which "starts off with a David Crowder-meets-Arcade Fire-esque indie sound" and features leading vocalist Chad Gardner "sing[ing] with an engaging and worshipful alt-rock style." "I Know" has "edgy electro tones."

Reception

From HM, "Clearly an album that pushes the boundaries of worship music, Becoming Who We Are aims to move beyond the comfort zone of the inspirational genre by adding layers and unique compositions to bring out a truly original sound and uncompromising message." From Indie Vision Music, "There are no words to describe it because there is nothing else like it." From Jesus Freak Hideout, "To point out all the highlights of this album would make for an extremely long read, because the entirety of the album is a highlight." From New Release Tuesday, "incredible album". From Worship Leader, "Energetic, frenetic, and infectious, Becoming Who We Are, is a musical cacophony of joyous praise and at times chaotic beauty." From Louder Than the Music, "This is a stunning album and well worth exploring." From Christian Review, "Becoming Who We Are is chaotic and eclectic".

Track listing

Personnel
Kings Kaleidoscope
 Jared Buck – guitar
 Nadia Ifland Essenpreis – vocals, keys, violin
 Chad Gardner – lead vocals, guitar, keys
 Lindsay Gardner – vocals, cello, keys
 Zawadi Morrow – vocals, flute, piano, violin 
 Andrew Nyte – drums
 John Platter – bells, drums, percussion
 Julianne Smith – accordion, violin
 Blake Strickland – trombone
 Zack Walkingstick – bass guitar

Technical
 Chad Gardner - production

Artwork and design
 Matt Naylor - cover artwork

Charts

References

2014 debut albums
Tooth & Nail Records albums